The following article contains a list of Prime Ministers of Belize and  Deputy Prime Ministers, from the establishment of the position of First Minister of British Honduras in 1961 to the present day.

Office of the Prime Minister of Belize
The office of prime minister is established by section 37 of the Constitution of Belize, which provides that the Governor-General of Belize "shall appoint a member of the House of Representatives who is the leader of the political party which commands the support of the majority of the members of that House; and if no political party has an overall majority, he shall appoint a member of that House who appears to him likely to command the support of the majority of the members of that House" The Prime Minister's principal office is the Sir Edney Cain Building, Belmopan.

First Minister of British Honduras (1961–1964)

Premier of British Honduras (1964–1973)

Premier of Belize (1973–1981)

Prime ministers of Belize (1981–present)

Office of the Deputy Prime Minister of Belize 

The deputy prime minister of Belize is an elected official who, according to the Constitution, "serves at the pleasure of the Prime Minister of Belize." The deputy prime minister is often the deputy leader of the largest political party in the House of Representatives of Belize that is in government.

List of deputy prime ministers of Belize since (1981–present)

See also
List of governors of British Honduras
Governor-General of Belize
 List of prime ministers of Queen Elizabeth II
 List of Commonwealth heads of government
 List of Privy Counsellors (1952–2022)

References

http://www.worldstatesmen.org/Belize.html
http://rulers.org/rulb1.html#belize

Belize
List
Prime Ministers
1981 establishments in Belize